In real algebraic geometry, the  Łojasiewicz inequality, named after Stanisław Łojasiewicz, gives an upper bound for the distance of a point to the nearest zero of a given real analytic function.  Specifically, let ƒ : U → R be a real analytic function on an open set U in Rn, and let Z be the zero locus of ƒ. Assume that Z is not empty.  Then for any compact set K in U, there exist positive constants α and C such that, for all  x in K 

Here α can be large.

The following form of this inequality is often seen in more analytic contexts:  with the same assumptions on f, for every p ∈ U there is a possibly smaller open neighborhood W of p and constants θ ∈ (0,1) and c > 0 such that

References

External links 

 

Inequalities
Mathematical analysis
Real algebraic geometry